Jarred Brooks Ford (born May 2, 1993) professionally known as Jarred Brooks, is an American professional mixed martial artist currently competing in ONE Championship, where he is the current ONE Strawweight World Champion. A professional competitor since 2014, he has also competed for the Ultimate Fighting Championship (UFC), Pancrase, Rizin Fighting Federation, and the World Series of Fighting (WSOF) (now Professional Fighters League).

Background
Born and raised in Warsaw, Indiana, Brooks began wrestling from a young age alongside his brother. Competing in the 113 lb. weight class, Brooks was highly-talented and a touted prospect coming out of high school, being ranked first overall in the nation for his weight class as a senior. During his junior season, Brooks entered the state tournament with a record of 27-1, making it to the final before losing. During his senior season, Brooks compiled an undefeated 35-0 record, capturing the state championship in the process. After originally attending Indiana Tech, he later transferred to Notre Dame College before focusing on a career in MMA.

Mixed martial arts career

Early career
Before joining the UFC, Brooks compiled a record of 12-0 consisting of a variety of different finishes along the way, and also held an amateur record of 28-1, capturing ten titles. His most notable wins before signing with UFC was the four time Shooto title challenger Junji Ito and Abdiel Velazquez when he became the House of Fame flyweight champion.

Ultimate Fighting Championship
Brooks was expected to face Ian McCall on February 11, 2017 at UFC 208. However, McCall was pulled from the fight the day it was scheduled to take place due to gastrointestinal illness.

Brooks made his promotional debut on July 29, 2017 at UFC 214 against TUF 24 semi-finalist Eric Shelton. He won the fight by split decision.

Brooks faced Deiveson Figueiredo on October 28, 2017 at UFC Fight Night: Machida vs. Brunson. He lost the bout via a controversial split decision.

Brooks was expected to face Hector Sandoval on June 1, 2018 at UFC Fight Night 131. However, Sandoval was removed from the bout on May 22 for undisclosed reasons and replaced by promotional newcomer Jose Torres. Brooks lost the fight in round two after he attempted to slam Torres, but accidentally knocked himself out in the process.

Brooks was tabbed as a short notice replacement to face Roberto Sanchez on September 8, 2018 at UFC 228. He won the fight via split decision.

On November 7, 2018, it was reported Brooks was released from UFC.

Rizin
After being released from the UFC, Brooks signed with Rizin FF and made his promotional debut against Haruo Ochi at Rizin 18 on August 18, 2019. The bout ended in a no contest due to an accidental headbutt early in the first round.

Brooks next fought with Warrior Xtreme Cagefighting at WXC 83, when he faced the undefeated Legacy Fighting Alliance veteran, Victor Altamirano. Brooks would dominate throughout the fight, and won by a rear-naked choke in the second round.

Brooks' next fight was a return to strawweight, during Bellator Japan, when he re-matched the highly rated DEEP strawweight champion Haruo Ochi. Brooks won a unanimous decision. This would lead many media outlets and fight analysts to name Brooks as the worlds best strawweight.

ONE Championship
Brooks signed a contract with ONE Championship, and was expected to make his promotional debut against Lito Adiwang at ONE on TNT 2 on April 14, 2021. Adiwang would later withdraw from the bout, due to a positive COVID-19 test. The bout was rescheduled for ONE Championship: NextGen III on November 26, 2021. He won the bout via arm-triangle choke in the second round.

Brooks faced Hiroba Minowa at ONE: Only the Brave on January 28, 2022. Brooks won the bout in dominant fashion via unanimous decision.

Brooks faced Bokang Masuyane at ONE 156 on April 22, 2022. Masuyane missed weight at the official weigh-ins and forfeited 20% of his purse to Brooks. Brooks won the fight by a first-round technical submission.

Brooks was scheduled to challenge the ONE Strawweight World Championship bout against Joshua Pacio at ONE 158 on June 3, 2022. However, the bout was eventually postponed, as Brooks withdrew from the fight due to an injury. The fight was rescheduled at ONE 164 on December 3, 2022. Brooks won the fight and the belt by unanimous decision.

Championships and accomplishments

Mixed martial arts
House of Fame
House of Fame Flyweight Championship (One time)
Fight Matrix
Strawweight Lineal Champion (One time, former)
ONE Championship
ONE Strawweight World Championship (One time, current)

Mixed martial arts record

|-
|Win
|align=center|20–2 (1)
|Joshua Pacio
|Decision (unanimous)
|ONE 164
|
|align=center|5
|align=center|5:00
|Pasay, Philippines
|
|-
|Win
|align=center|19–2 (1)
|Bokang Masunyane
|Technical Submission (rear-naked choke)
|ONE 156
|
|align=center|1
|align=center|4:39
|Kallang, Singapore
|
|-
|Win
|align=center|18–2 (1)
|Hiroba Minowa
|Decision (unanimous)
|ONE: Only the Brave
|
|align=center|3
|align=center|5:00
|Kallang, Singapore
|
|-
|Win
|align=center|17–2 (1)
|Lito Adiwang
|Submission (arm-triangle choke)
|ONE Championship: NextGen III
|
|align=center|2
|align=center|3:07
|Kallang, Singapore
|
|-
|Win
|align=center|16–2 (1)
|Haruo Ochi
|Decision (unanimous)
|Bellator & Rizin: Japan
|
|align=center|3
|align=center|5:00
|Saitama, Japan
|
|-
|Win
|align=center|15–2 (1)
|Victor Altamirano
|Submission (rear-naked choke)
|Warrior Xtreme Cagefighting 83
|
|align=center|2
|align=center|4:19
|Southgate, Michigan, United States
|
|-
|NC
|align=center|14–2 (1)
|Haruo Ochi
|No Contest (accidental headbutt) 
|Rizin 18
|
|align=center|1
|align=center|0:11
|Nagoya, Japan
|
|-
|Win
|align=center|14–2
|Roberto Sanchez
|Decision (split)
|UFC 228
|
|align=center|3
|align=center|5:00
|Dallas, Texas, United States
|
|-
|Loss
|align=center|13–2
|Jose Torres
|KO (slam)
|UFC Fight Night: Rivera vs. Moraes
|
|align=center|2
|align=center|2:55
|Utica, New York, United States
|
|-
|Loss
|align=center|13–1
|Deiveson Figueiredo
|Decision (split)
|UFC Fight Night: Brunson vs. Machida
|
|align=center|3
|align=center|5:00
|São Paulo, Brazil
|
|-
|Win
|align=center|13–0
|Eric Shelton
|Decision (split)
|UFC 214
|
|align=center|3
|align=center|5:00
|Anaheim, California, United States
|
|-
|Win
|align=center|12–0
|Jun Nakamura
|KO (punch)
|Pancrase 281
|
|align=center|2
|align=center|1:23
|Tokyo, Japan
|
|-
|Win
|align=center|11–0
|Corey Simmons
|Submission (rear-naked choke)
|Fight Night at the Island: Saunders vs. Volkmann
|
|align=center|1
|align=center|2:36
|Welch, Minnesota, United States
|
|-
|Win
|align=center|10–0
|Erik Vo
|Submission (rear-naked choke)
|PC MMA: Pinnacle Combat 23
|
|align=center|1
|align=center|3:05
|Dubuque, Iowa, United States
|
|-
|Win
|align=center| 9–0
|Chris Miah
|Decision (unanimous)
|WFCA 16: Grand Prix Akhmat 
|
|align=center|3
|align=center|5:00
|Grozny, Russia
|
|-
|Win
|align=center| 8–0
|Junji Ito
|KO (elbows)
|World Series of Fighting Global Championship: Japan 1
|
|align=center|2
|align=center|3:29
|Tokyo, Japan
|
|-
|Win
|align=center|7–0
|Abdiel Velazquez
|Decision (unanimous)
|House of Fame 4: Florida vs. Georgia
|
|align=center|3
|align=center|5:00
|Jacksonville, Florida, United States
|
|-
|Win
|align=center|6–0
|Trevor Ward
|Decision (unanimous)
|Michiana Fight League 38
|
|align=center|3
|align=center|5:00
|South Bend, Indiana, United States
|
|-
|Win
|align=center|5–0
|Joey Diehl
|Decision (unanimous)
|Michiana Fight League 37
|
|align=center|3
|align=center|5:00
|South Bend, Indiana, United States
|
|-
|Win
|align=center|4–0
|C.J. Hamilton
|Decision (split)
|Alpha One Sports: IT Fight Series 30
|
|align=center|3
|align=center|5:00
|Bellefontaine, Ohio, United States
|
|-
|Win
|align=center|3–0
|Marshawn Hughes
|Submission (arm-triangle choke)
|Legends of Fighting 55
|
|align=center|1
|align=center|0:57
|Indianapolis, Indiana, United States
|
|-
|Win
|align=center|2–0
|Arthur Parker
|Submission (rear-naked choke)
|Absolute Fighting Championship 22
|
|align=center|1
|align=center|1:23
|Hollywood, Florida, United States
|
|-
|Win
|align=center|1–0
|Chris Catala
|Submission
|Xplode Fight Series: Lock Down
|
|align=center|1
|align=center|0:21
|Davenport, Iowa, United States
|

Amateur mixed martial arts record

|-
|Win
|align=center| 13–0
|Jay Edwards 
|Submission (rear-naked choke) 
|MFL 34 
|May 17, 2014
|align=center|2
|align=center|1:32
|South Bend, Indiana, United States
|
|-
|Win
|align=center| 12–0
|Levi Rose 
|Submission (verbal submission) 
|ELE - Extreme Combat Challenge
|March 29, 2014
|align=center|2
|align=center|1:25
|Muncie, IN, United States
|
|-
|Win
|align=center| 11–0
|Christopher Tanner 
|Submission (strikes) 
|AoW 9 - The Return 
|February 1, 2014
|align=center|1
|align=center|2:53
|Indianapolis, United States
|
|-
|Win
|align=center| 10–0
|Christopher Tanner 
|Submission (armbar) 
|MFL 31 
|August 23, 2013
|align=center|1
|align=center|2:15
|South Bend, Indiana, United States
|
|-
|Win
|align=center| 9–0
|Isaac Flores 
|TKO 
|Misfit MMA 06/01/13
|June 1, 2013
|align=center|2
|align=center|1:00
|Holland, Michigan, United States
|
|-
|Win
|align=center| 8–0
|Daxton Guericke 
|Submission (armbar)  
|MFL 26 
|August 18, 2012
|align=center|2
|align=center|1:04
|South Bend, Indiana, United States
|
|-
|Win
|align=center| 7–0
|Zach Spicher 
|Submission (rear-naked choke)  
|Elite Kagefighting Championship 2 
|July 28, 2012
|align=center|1
|align=center|2:25
|Warsaw, Indiana, United States
|
|-
|Win
|align=center| 6–0
|Mikeal Wood, Jr. 
|Submission (guillotine choke)  
|MFL 25
|June 2, 2012
|align=center|1
|align=center|0:19
|South Bend, Indiana, United States
|
|-
|Win
|align=center| 5–0
|Matt Baker 
|Submission (rear-naked choke) 
|XXX Extreme Fighting: Judgement Day 
|October 1, 2011
|align=center|1
|align=center|2:17
|Benton Harbor, United States
|
|-
|Win
|align=center| 4–0
|Dallas Berger 
|Submission (armbar) 
|Chaos at the Cove 
|September 2, 2011
|align=center|1
|align=center|2:58
|South Bend, Indiana, United States
|
|-
|Win
|align=center| 3–0
|Dereck Dooley 
|TKO (corner stoppage)
|XXX Extreme Fighting: Indiana vs Michigan 2
|August 21, 2010 
|align=center|2
|align=center|0:38
|South Bend, Indiana, United States
|
|-
|Win
|align=center| 2–0
|Zach Sterling 
|Decision (unanimous)
|Extreme Challenge 159 
|August 13, 2010
|align=center|3
|align=center|3:00
|Elkhart, Indiana, United States
|
|-
|Win
|align=center| 1–0
|Vu Pham 
|Decision (unanimous)
|Total Fight Series 2 
|July 10, 2010
|align=center|3
|align=center|5:00
|Huntington, Indiana, United States
|
|-
|}

See also
 List of current ONE fighters

References

External links
 
 

American male mixed martial artists
Mixed martial artists from Indiana
Flyweight mixed martial artists
Mixed martial artists utilizing wrestling
People from Kosciusko County, Indiana
1993 births
Living people
Ultimate Fighting Championship male fighters
American male sport wrestlers
Amateur wrestlers
ONE Championship champions